Agreeable was launched in 1786 in Liverpool, possibly under another name. Between 1798 and 1802 she made three voyages as a slave ship. A French privateer captured her in 1803 as she was sailing from Africa to the West Indies on her fourth slave trading voyage.

Career
Agreeable first appeared in Lloyd's Register (LR) in 1798.

1st slave voyage (1798–1799): Captain James Seddon sailed from Liverpool on 16 July 1798. Agreeable gathered her slaves in West Central Africa and she arrived at Kingston, Jamaica on 27 May 1799 with 290 slaves. She left Kingston on 23 June and arrived back at Liverpool on 16 September. She had left with 33 crew members and she suffered six crew deaths on her voyage.

2nd slave voyage (1800–1801): Captain Seddon sailed from Liverpool on 7 May 1800. Agreeable gathered her slaves in West Central Africa and she arrived at Kingston on 4 February 1801 with 222 slaves. Either before or after she arrived at Kingston, but probably before, Agreeable was at Suriname. She sailed for Liverpool on 7 April and arrived there on 8 June. She had left Liverpool with 33 crew members and arrived at Kingston with 35; she suffered one crew death on her voyage.

3rd slave voyage (1801–1802): Captain Seddon sailed from Liverpool on 6 November 1801. Agreeable gathered her slaves at Bonny and arrived at St Kitts on 19 June 1802 with 233 slaves. She sailed from St Kitts on 25 July and arrived back at Liverpool on 10 September. She had left Liverpool with 27 crew members and she had suffered five crew deaths on her voyage.

4th slave voyage (1803–Loss): Captain Seddon sailed Agreeable , with her 24 crew members, from Liverpool on 8 March 1803. While Experiment was sailing from Africa to the West Indies, a privateer captured her to windward of Barbados. The privateer took Agreeable to Guadeloupe.

Citations

1786 ships
Age of Sail merchant ships of England
Liverpool slave ships
Captured ships